Volleyball Casalmaggiore is an Italian women's volleyball club based in Casalmaggiore and currently playing in the Serie A1.

Previous names
Due to sponsorship, the club have competed under the following names:
 VBC Pallavolo Rosa (2008–2009)
 VBC Pomì (2009–2010)
 Pomì Casalmaggiore (2010–2019)
 VBC Èpiù Casalmaggiore (2020–present)

History
The club was founded in 2008 by the acquisition of a Serie B2 licence from Pallavolo Zevio. The club was named , VBC is the acronym for Volley Ball Casalmaggiore. As the club progressed through the national leagues, the home venue was changed to comply with league regulations and accommodate a larger number of supporters. From the Palazzetto dello Sport Baslenga in Casalmaggiore, the club first moved to PalaFarina in Viadana and then to PalaRadi in Cremona. The first promotion happened in 2010 to Serie B1, one season later promotion to Serie A2 was achieved and in 2013 it reached the Serie A1.

Team

Season 2020–2021, as of September 2020.

Current coaching staff

Honours

National competitions
  National League: 1
2014–15

  Italian Super Cup: 1
2015–16

International competitions
  CEV Champions League: 1
2015–16

References

External links

Official website 

Italian women's volleyball clubs
Volleyball clubs established in 2008
2008 establishments in Italy
Province of Cremona
Sport in Lombardy
Serie A1 (women's volleyball) clubs